"Heartbroke" is a song written by Guy Clark, and originally recorded by Rodney Crowell on his 1980 album But What Will the Neighbors Think.

It was later recorded by American country music artist Ricky Skaggs.  It was released in July 1982 as the first single from the album Highways & Heartaches.  The song was Skaggs' third #1 on the country chart.  The single stayed at #1 for one week and spent a total of eleven weeks on the country chart.

Charts

Other versions
George Strait released his version on his second album Strait from the Heart in 1982, not knowing the song had been recorded by Skaggs about two weeks earlier.
The Marshall Tucker Band also released a version on their 1982 album Tuckerized.

References

1982 singles
Rodney Crowell songs
Ricky Skaggs songs
George Strait songs
The Marshall Tucker Band songs
Songs written by Guy Clark
Epic Records singles
Song recordings produced by Ricky Skaggs
1980 songs